Daniel Wilson is an American singer, songwriter and record producer from Ypsilanti, Michigan, United States. His debut EP, Young Rubbish, was released in 2014 by the London-based record label Zap Records, and featured production credits by Sam Billen and Ryan Pinkston. His latest release, Boy Who Cried Thunder, was released in November 2014 also on Zap Records. In 2015, he contributed with The Weeknd in co-writing and producing "Sidewalks", featuring vocals from Kendrick Lamar, which appears in his third album, entitled Starboy. He has also worked with notable artists, producers and musicians such as Miguel, Twin Shadow, Joe Goddard, ZHU, DJ Dahi, Leo Abrahams among many others. Do not mistake him for the Nigerian Daniel Wilson, who is also a musician.

Biography
Growing up "on a diet of gospel, Christian music, musicals and '90s MTV", Daniel Wilson started his musical trajectory at the age of 13 in a gospel choir. His first solo compositions came to life in 2008 using his mother's old tape recorder and, eventually, switching to cheap computer software. The artist was signed by London-based music label Zap Records in 2013.

Music
Wilson's music can be described as a sort of "indie-ish synthetic R&B, in parts electronic and ecclesiastic", while his particular crooning skills grant him a "rare, elastic falsetto". Musical influences range from Michael and Janet Jackson, Prince, Mariah Carey, and gospel music, and his music can be compared to those recorded by acts including Blood Orange, Bloc Party, and TV on the Radio.

Discography

EPs
 Young Rubbish (2014), Zap Records
 Boy Who Cried Thunder (2014), Zap Records
 Sinner of The Week (2016), Zap Records

Songwriting and production discography

References

Living people
American singer-songwriters
American electronic musicians
21st-century American singers
1990 births